Russell Collins (born Russell Henry Collins; October 11, 1897 – November 14, 1965) was an American actor whose 43-year career included hundreds of performances on stage, in feature films, and on television.

Early life
Born in 1897 in Indianapolis, Indiana, Russell Collins was the middle child of Emma (née Hughes) and Martin F. Collins' five children. He had a younger brother and sister, Raymond and Maxina, as well as an older brother and sister, Oren and Irene. By 1910, Russell's father had become disabled and jobless, so his mother supported him and the rest of the family by working as a seamstress from their home. Emma's responsibilities for the family were so predominant, in fact, that she is identified in the 1910 United States Census as "Head" of the Collins' household.

As a student in the Drama School at Carnegie Tech, Collins "first learned his trade in the days immediately following World War I." He also attended Indiana University and Northwestern University.

Career
Collins had roles in a few early Group Theatre productions with Success Story being his Broadway debut. Probably his most noted Broadway role was as the star of the 1935 musical play Johnny Johnson. He enjoyed a long career on Broadway, although by the late 1940s, he began to perform increasingly in Hollywood films and on television, where he appeared in teleplay dramas, as well as on Westerns, sitcoms, and on an array of other weekly series. He remained in high demand as a character actor and worked on television to shortly before his death. His 1957 appearance in the Alfred Hitchcock Presents episode "The Night the World Ended" was a typical TV role, as was his 1962 role as a caring town doctor in “The Nancy Davis Story” on the TV Western Wagon Train (S5E33).

He played Doc in the 1950 London production of Mr. Roberts at the Coliseum Theatre with 
Tyrone Power as Mr. Roberts and Jackie Cooper as Ensign Pulver.

Death
He died November 14, 1965, in West Hollywood, California.  His gravesite is located in the Elsinore Valley Cemetery at Lake Elsinore, California.

Selected Broadway roles

 Success Story (1932) as Harry Fisher
 Both Your Houses (1933) as Peebles
 Men in White (1933) as Dr. Cunningham
 Gentlewoman (1934) as Havens
 Gold Eagle Guy (1934) as a deserter and as Ed Walker
 Till the Day I Die (1935) as Schlupp
 Waiting For Lefty (1935) as Fatt and as Fayette and as Reilly
 Paradise Lost (1935) as homeless man
 Johnny Johnson (1935) as Johnny Johnson
 The Star-Wagon (1937) as Hanus Wicks
 Missouri Legend (1938) as Jim Cummins
 Here Come the Clowns (1938) as John Dickinson
 Morning's at Seven (1939) as Carl Bolton
 The Moon is Down (1942) as Major Hunter
 Carousel (1945) as Starkeeper and as Dr. Seldon
 The Iceman Cometh (1946) as James Cameron
 The Liar (1950) as Brighelia
 Sabrina Fair (1953) as Fairchild
 Sunrise at Campobello (1958) as Louis McHenry Howe (replacement)
 Romulus (1962) as Achilles
 Calculated Risk (1962) as Jonathan Travis

Filmography

References

External links
 
 
 Russell Collins
 Mr. Roberts
 Johnny Johnson: An Appreciation
 Museum of the City of New York photo of Russell Collins with Grouip Theatre members

1897 births
1965 deaths
American male stage actors
20th-century American male actors
American male film actors
American male telenovela actors
Male actors from Indianapolis
Indiana State University alumni